Rally Championship Xtreme is a rally computer game which is part of the Rally Championship series and a sequel to Mobil 1 Rally Championship (1999). The game was released for Windows on 2 November 2001. It is developed by Warthog Games and published by Actualize (formerly known as Europress). It features 27 cars and 24 tracks from around the world. A sequel, Rally Championship, was released in 2002.

Reception

Gamezilla gave a positive review but criticized the technical performance saying that "I suspect with a real screamer of a video card and a processor much faster than recommended, this game would be truly world class".

References

External links
Warthog Sweden/42-Bit AB page

2001 video games
Europe-exclusive video games
Rally racing video games
Video games developed in the United Kingdom
Windows games
Windows-only games